Mehndi is the application of henna as a temporary form of skin decoration.

Mehndi may also refer to:

Film and television 
 Mehndi (1958 film), a 1958 Indian Hindi-language film
 Mehndi (1998 film), a 1998 Indian Bollywood drama film
 Mehndi (TV series), a 2003 Pakistani television series that aired on PTV

Other uses 
 Daler Mehndi (born 1967), bhangra/pop singer from India

See also 
 Mehndi Tere Naam Ki, a 2002 Indian television series
 Mehndi Hai Rachne Waali, a 2021 Indian television series
 Mehndi Waley Hath, a 2000 film
 Mehboob Ki Mehndi, a 1971 film
 Masala! Mehndi! Masti!, a festival